Andrija Vuković (born 3 August 1983) is a Croatian footballer. He is the twin brother of the handball player Drago Vuković.

References

External links
 

1983 births
Living people
Footballers from Split, Croatia
Croatian twins
Twin sportspeople
Association football goalkeepers
Croatian footballers
HNK Hajduk Split players
NK Solin players
NK Novalja players
NK Mosor players
NK Zadar players
RNK Split players
NK Dugopolje players
Balıkesirspor footballers
Croatian Football League players
First Football League (Croatia) players
Süper Lig players
TFF First League players
Croatian expatriate footballers
Expatriate footballers in Turkey
Croatian expatriate sportspeople in Turkey